Ralph McDaniels (born February 27, 1962) is an American music video director, DJ and VJ. He co-created and co-hosts the music video program Video Music Box with Lionel C. Martin.

Biography 
McDaniels was born in Brooklyn, New York. His parents moved to Queens, New York when he was eleven. McDaniels studied communications at LaGuardia Community College. He later started the video production company Classic Concepts with Video Music Box producer Lionel Martin.

In 1983 After interning at WNYC in New York City, and subsequently becoming a radio engineer, McDaniels created Studio 31 Dance Party, a television show revolving around recordings of music performances. This show would transform into Video Music Box, which was created and hosted by McDaniels and Martin by.

In 1994, McDaniels who became known as "Uncle Ralph", directed Rapper Nas first solo video, for his second single, It Ain't Hard To Tell. The video was aired on Video Music Box, which became the longest-running music video show in the world.

On December 3, 2021,  Showtime premiered the Documentary, "You're Watching Video Music Box", chronicling the longest-running music video show, "Video Music Box" with never before seen footage from the vault of McDaniels. The documentary is written by Steve Rivo and Andre Wilkins and directed by Rapper Nas who is also featured in the documentary along with McDaniels.

He now works for the Queens Library for Outreach Services.

References

American hip hop DJs
American music video directors
American people of Trinidad and Tobago descent
Living people
VJs (media personalities)
People from Queens, New York
1962 births